Musah is a male given name and surname:

People with the given name 
 Musah Amevor (born 31 October 1996), Ghanaian professional footballer
 Musah Nuhu (born 17 January 1997), Ghanaian professional footballer

People with the surname 
 Abdul-Aziz Ayaba Musah, Ghanaian member of parliament
 Adam Musah (born 7 July 2002), Ghanaian professional footballer
 Ahmed Musah, Ghanaian politician
 Alhassan Musah, Ghanaian politician
 Baba Abdulai Musah (born 18 December 1996), Ghanaian professional footballer
 Kojo Musah (born 15 April 1996), Danish sprinter
 Matbali Musah, Malaysian politician
 Samira Musah, American biomedical engineer and professor
 Suley Musah (born 6 May 1979), retired Ghanaian professional footballer
 Suraj Musah (born 27 May 2001), Ghanaian footballer
 Yunus Dimoara Musah (born November 29, 2002), American professional football player

See also 
 
 Musa (name)